Zorky is a bandy club based in Krasnogorsk, Moscow Oblast, Russia.  Its team currently plays in the Russian Bandy Super League, the top tier of the Russian bandy championship. The club was founded in 1954. Zorky have had some recent successes and reached the finals of the Bandy World Cup, Russian Cup and Champions Cup in the 2006–07 season only to lose to Dynamo Moscow in all three matches. In 2009 they reached the World Cup final again, this time losing to Hammarby. In 2012, they won the World Cup. The team was the best team of the regular season of the Russian Bandy Super League 2012–13 but lost the final against Dynamo Moscow for the national championship.

For the 2016–17 season, the team almost got bankrupt and was relegated to the Russian Bandy Supreme League. For the 2017–18 season, it returned to the Super League.

The club also has a women's team. This won the national championship for women in 2012 and in 2015.

Zorky's home shirts are yellow.

Honours

Domestic
 Russian Champions (men):
 Winners (3): 1979, 1992, 1993

Cup
 Russian Bandy Cup:
 Winners (6): 1985, 1986, 1989, 1990, 1991, 1993

International
 World Cup:
 Winners (2): 1990, 2012
 Runners-up (2): 2006, 2009
 European Cup:
 Winners (1): 1992
 Champions Cup:
 Winners (3): 2010, 2011, 2012
 Runners-up (3): 2006, 2007, 2009

Zorky-2
Zorky's second team Zorky-2 plays in the Russian Bandy Supreme League, the second tier of Russian bandy.

References

External links
Official Website 

Bandy clubs in Russia
Bandy clubs in the Soviet Union
Sport in Moscow Oblast
1961 establishments in Russia
Bandy clubs established in 1961
Krasnogorsky District, Moscow Oblast